German submarine U-1275 was a Type VIIC/41 U-boat of Nazi Germany's Kriegsmarine during World War II.

She was ordered on 13 June 1942, and was laid down on 7 July 1943, at Bremer Vulkan-Vegesacker Werft, Bremen-Vegesack, as yard number 70. She was launched on 8 February 1944, and commissioned under the command of Oberleutnant zur See Hellmut Niss on 22 March 1944.

Design
German Type VIIC/41 submarines were preceded by the heavier Type VIIC submarines. U-1275 had a displacement of  when at the surface and  while submerged. She had two shafts and two  propellers.

U-1275 was fitted with five  torpedo tubes (four fitted at the bow and one at the stern), fourteen torpedoes, one  SK C/35 naval gun, (220 rounds), one  Flak M42 and two  C/30 anti-aircraft guns. The boat had a complement of between forty-four and fifty-two.

Service history
On 3 May 1945, U-1275 was scuttled at the Deutsche Werke shipyard in Kiel off of berth No. 5. Her wreck was raised and broken up.

See also
 Battle of the Atlantic

References

Bibliography

German Type VIIC/41 submarines
U-boats commissioned in 1944
World War II submarines of Germany
1943 ships
Ships built in Bremen (state)
Operation Regenbogen (U-boat)
Maritime incidents in May 1945
U-boats scuttled in 1945